Padmini Thomas  is an Indian athlete and a former president of the Kerala State Sports Council. She won a Silver  medal in  4 × 100 m relay and a bronze medal in the  400 metres in the 1982 Asian Games. She is a recipient of the Arjuna Award.

Thomas was married to John Selvan, a former Indian athlete, who died on May 6, 2020, succumbing to the injuries sustained from a fall from the terrace of their home in Thiruvananthapuram. Her daughter, Diana John Selvan and son, Dany John Selvan, are both sports persons in their own right.

References

Athletes (track and field) at the 1982 Asian Games
Asian Games silver medalists for India
Asian Games bronze medalists for India
Asian Games medalists in athletics (track and field)
Medalists at the 1982 Asian Games
Recipients of the Arjuna Award